Mario Häring (born November 1989) is a German pianist. In 2018, he won the second prize at the Leeds International Piano Competition.

References 

1989 births
German classical pianists
Male classical pianists
Living people
21st-century classical pianists
21st-century male musicians